Ahta may refer to:

Ahta Indian Reserve No. 3, on the Coast of British Columbia, Canada
The Ahta River, at the mouth of which is the aforesaid Indian reserve, at the head of Bond Sound
The Ahta Valley, the valley of that river
AHTA, the American Horticultural Therapy Association

See also
Ahtna
Hata (disambiguation)
Hada (disambiguation)